The genus Crambus includes around 155 species of moths in the family Crambidae, distributed globally. The adult stages are called crambid snout moths (a name shared with the rest of the family Crambidae, to distinguish them from Pyralidae snouth moths), while the larvae of Crambus and the related genus Herpetogramma are the sod webworms, which can damage grasses.

Life cycle 

Sod webworms have a bivoltine life cycle with four stages: egg, larva, pupa and imago (adult). They overwinter as larvae in their final or penultimate instar in the thatch or soil. With the coming of warmer weather, the larvae will pupate, and moths will appear in late spring or early summer. The first generation of eggs is laid in June, with larvae appearing in June and lasting until July. Adult moths appear from July until August. Under favorable conditions, a second generation will occur, with the adult stage laying eggs in early October.

Egg 
The eggs of Crambus species are dry and nonadhesive, with an oval to elliptical shape. The eggs of most species are white to creamy white when first laid, but later turn bright orange or red. The size of the eggs varies between species, but ranges from 0.3 mm to 0.6 mm.

Larva 
The color of the larvae also varies from greenish to beige, brown, or gray, with most larvae having dark, circular spots that extend over the entire body. From the first instar to the third instar, the head capsule will appear black, but later instars have a light brown head capsule with various black sculpturation. At the first instar, the head capsule is 0.19–0.23 mm wide, growing to 1.23–2.21 mm by the last instar.

Crambus larvae, known as "sod webworms", feed primarily on grasses. In turfgrass species, their primary host plants are cool-season grasses, with fewer records on warm-season grasses. Some species also feed on maize, wheat, rye, oats, timothy-grass, and other grasses in pastures, and meadows, with the most damage occurring in areas with permanent sod. The damage caused is more pronounced during times of drought.

Pupa 
The pupa develops in a silken cocoon attached to soil particles, plant debris and fecal pellets. The cocoon resembles a small lump of earth, while the pupa itself is pale yellow at first, darkening to a mahogany brown.

Imago 
The adult moth is whitish or light gray to tan. Many species have patterns of colors, including silver, gold, yellow, brown and  black. Like other snout moths, they have long labial palpi that extend in front of their heads, and fold their wings underneath their bodies, making them slender and harder to see while resting on plants.

Damage 
Sod webworms were first recognized as a serious pest of lawns and golf courses during the drought of 1928–1934 that affected most of the United States. Unlike many of the other more destructive turfgrass pests, the sod webworm is native to the United States and was not introduced.

Most damage occurs during the first instar, when the sod webworm only feeds on the foliage of the turfgrass. Damage is often seen as a small area of leaves that are yellow to brown. Sod webworms themselves will not be seen because of their nocturnal nature. During the day, the sod webworm can be found in its burrow in the center of the damaged area. Even though damage can be an eyesore, it does not hurt the turf because no damage is done to the crown of the plant. In closely mown turf and drought conditions, damage is more severe than in poorly maintained turf. In closely mown turf, symptoms will appear more quickly and prominently. During drought conditions, damage is more severe because the damage is often not seen until rainfall occurs.

Management 
To be considered a serious infestation of sod webworms, 12 larvae must be found in a  area. To test this, hollow pans are placed with a pyrethrum or detergent drench and allowed to sit for 10 minutes, then the larvae in the area are counted. During peak growing periods, the grass will often be able to recover by itself and not show serious damage. For high-end turf that cannot show any damage or serious infestations, predators of the sod webworms must be attracted, including birds and insect predators, such as ground beetles, robber flies, and predatory wasps. The larva is also prone to infection from microorganisms such as Beauveria bassiana and Nosema (Microsporidia). Parasitic nematodes such as Steinernema carpocapsae and Heterorhabditis heliothidis can also infect sod webworms.

Systematics and taxonomy 
The genus Crambus was erected by Johan Christian Fabricius in 1798, and was originally used to cover species which are now considered to belong to the Noctuidae. The type species was designated by John Curtis in 1826 as Phalaena pascuella (now Crambus pascuella). Fabricius originally included 62 species, a number which had increased by 1940 to 116, of which only 98 were thought to be valid. A 1986 estimate suggested there were "perhaps 400" species of Crambus.

Species in the genus Crambus now are:

 Crambus achilles Błeszyński, 1961
 Crambus acyperas Hampson, 1919
 Crambus agitatellus Clemens, 1860
 Crambus ainslieellus Klots, 1942
 Crambus albellus Clemens, 1860
 Crambus albifrons Schaus, 1913
 Crambus alexandrus Kirpichnikova, 1979
 Crambus alienellus (Germar E. F. & Fr. Kaulfuss, 1817)
 Crambus angulatus Barnes & McDunnough, 1918
 Crambus angustalatellus Maassen, 1890
 Crambus angustexon Błeszyński, 1962
 Crambus archimedes Błeszyński, 1961
 Crambus argyrophorus Butler, 1878
 Crambus aristophanes Błeszyński, 1961
 Crambus arnaudiae Rougeot, 1977
 Crambus athamas Błeszyński, 1961
 Crambus attis Bassi, 2012
 Crambus autotoxellus Dyar, 1914
 Crambus averroellus Bassi, 1990
 Crambus awemellus McDunnough, 1921
 Crambus bachi Bassi, 2012
 Crambus bellinii Bassi in Bassi & Trematerra, 2014
 Crambus bellissimus Błeszyński, 1961
 Crambus berliozi Bassi, 2012
 Crambus bidens Zeller, 1872
 Crambus bidentellus Hampson, 1919
 Crambus bigelovi Klots, 1967
 Crambus bipartellus South in Leech & South, 1901
 Crambus boislamberti Rougeot, 1977
 Crambus brachiiferus Hampson, 1919
 Crambus braunellus Klots, 1940
 Crambus brunneisquamatus Hampson, 1919
 Crambus caligula Błeszyński, 1961
 Crambus claviger Staudinger, 1899
 Crambus coccophthorus Błeszyński, 1962
 Crambus cockleellus Kearfott, 1908
 Crambus cormieri Błeszyński, 1961
 Crambus coryolanus Błeszyński, 1961
 Crambus cypridalis Hulst, 1886
 Crambus cyrilellus Klots, 1942
 Crambus cyrnellus Schawerda, 1926
 Crambus daeckellus Haimbach, 1907
 Crambus damotellus Schaus, 1922
 Crambus dedalus Bassi, 2000
 Crambus delineatellus Hampson, 1896
 Crambus descarpentriesi (Rougeot, 1977)
 Crambus dianiphalis Hampson, 1908
 Crambus diarhabdellus Hampson, 1919
 Crambus dimidiatellus Grote, 1883
 Crambus ellipticellus Hampson, 1919
 Crambus elongatus Hampson, 1919
 Crambus erechtheus Bassi, 1992
 Crambus ericella (Hübner, 1813)
 Crambus erostratus Bassi, 1992
 Crambus eurypides Błeszyński, 1961
 Crambus falcarius Zeller, 1872
 Crambus frescobaldii Bassi, 2012
 Crambus gausapalis Hulst, 1886
 Crambus geleches Błeszyński, 1967
 Crambus girardellus Clemens, 1860
 Crambus guerini Błeszyński, 1961
 Crambus hamella (Thunberg, 1794)
 Crambus hampsoni Błeszyński, 1961
 Crambus harrisi Klots, 1967
 Crambus hastifer Staudinger, 1899
 Crambus hemileucalis Hampson, 1896
 Crambus heringiellus Herrich-Schäffer, 1848
 Crambus humidellus Zeller, 1877
 Crambus icarus Błeszyński, 1961
 Crambus isshiki Matsumura, 1925
 Crambus johnsoni Klots, 1942
 Crambus jupiter Błeszyński, 1963
 Crambus kazitaellus Bassi, 1986
 Crambus kumatakellus Shibuya, 1928
 Crambus kuzakaiensis Okano, 1960
 Crambus lacteella Janse, 1922
 Crambus laqueatellus Clemens, 1860
 Crambus lascaellus Druce, 1896
 Crambus lathoniellus (Zincken, 1817)
 Crambus leachellus (Zincken, 1818)
 Crambus leuconotus Zeller, 1881
 Crambus leucoschalis Hampson, 1898
 Crambus lyonsellus Haimbach, 1915
 Crambus magnificus Błeszyński, 1956
 Crambus melanoneurus Hampson, 1919
 Crambus mesombrellus Hampson, 1919
 Crambus microstrigatus Hampson, 1919
 Crambus midas Błeszyński, 1961
 Crambus moeschleralis Schaus, 1940
 Crambus monostictus Hampson, 1919
 Crambus mozarti Bassi, 2012
 Crambus multilinellus Fernald, 1887
 Crambus multiradiellus Hampson, 1896
 Crambus narcissus Błeszyński, 1961
 Crambus nephretete Błeszyński, 1961
 Crambus netuncus Bassi, 2012
 Crambus neurellus Hampson, 1919
 Crambus nigriscriptellus South in Leech & South, 1901
 Crambus nigrivarialis Gaede, 1916
 Crambus niitakaensis Marumo, 1936
 Crambus nivellus (Kollar in Kollar & Redtenbacher, 1844)
 Crambus nolckeniellus Zeller, 1872
 Crambus occidentalis Grote, 1880
 Crambus okinawanus Inoue, 1982
 Crambus ovidius Błeszyński, 1961
 Crambus palustrellus Ragonot, 1876
 Crambus paris Bassi, 2012
 Crambus pascuella (Linnaeus, 1758)
 Crambus patulellus Walker, 1863
 Crambus pavidellus Schaus, 1913
 Crambus perlella (Scopoli, 1763)
 Crambus perspicuus Walker, 1870
 Crambus praefectellus (Zincken, 1821)
 Crambus pratella (Linnaeus, 1758)
 Crambus prometheus Błeszyński, 1961
 Crambus proteus Bassi & Mey in Mey, 2011
 Crambus pseudargyrophorus Okano, 1960
 Crambus psychellus Maassen, 1890
 Crambus puccinii Bassi, 2000
 Crambus pythagoras Błeszyński, 1961
 Crambus quinquareatus Zeller, 1877
 Crambus racabellus Druce, 1896
 Crambus reducta Janse, 1922
 Crambus richteri Błeszyński, 1963
 Crambus rickseckerellus Klots, 1940
 Crambus rossinii Bassi, 2012
 Crambus sachaensis Ustjuzhanin, 1988
 Crambus saltuellus Zeller, 1863
 Crambus sanfordellus Klots, 1942
 Crambus sapidus Błeszyński, 1967
 Crambus sargentellus Klots, 1942
 Crambus satrapellus (Zincken, 1821)
 Crambus sebrus Błeszyński, 1961
 Crambus sectitermina Hampson, 1910
 Crambus sibirica Alphéraky, 1897
 Crambus silvella (Hübner, 1813)
 Crambus sinicolellus Caradja, 1926
 Crambus sjoestedti Aurivillius, 1910
 Crambus sparselloides Bassi, 1986
 Crambus sparsellus Walker, 1866
 Crambus sperryellus Klots, 1940
 Crambus sudanicola Strand, 1915
 Crambus tenuis Bassi, 1992
 Crambus tenuistriga Hampson, 1898
 Crambus tessellatus Hampson, 1919
 Crambus themistocles Błeszyński, 1961
 Crambus thersites Błeszyński, 1961
 Crambus theseus Bassi, 2000
 Crambus tomanaellus Marumo, 1936
 Crambus trichusalis Hulst, 1886
 Crambus tutillus McDunnough, 1921
 Crambus uliginosellus Zeller, 1850
 Crambus uniformella Janse, 1922
 Crambus unistriatellus Packard, 1867
 Crambus vagistrigellus de Joannis, 1913
 Crambus varii Bassi, 2012
 Crambus viettellus Błeszyński & Collins, 1962
 Crambus virgatellus Wileman, 1911
 Crambus vittiterminellus Hampson, 1919
 Crambus vulcanus Bassi, 2000
 Crambus watsonellus Klots, 1942
 Crambus whalleyi Błeszyński, 1960
 Crambus whitmerellus Klots, 1942
 Crambus xonorus Błeszyński, 1963
 Crambus youngellus Kearfott, 1908
 Crambus zelator Bassi, 1992

Former species 
 Crambus argyrostola Hampson, 1919
 Crambus xebus Błeszyński, 1962

References

External links 

 
 

Crambini
Agricultural pest insects
Crambidae genera
Taxa named by Johan Christian Fabricius